Godemar du Fay may refer to:
Godemar I du Fay (died 1350)
Godemar II du Fay (died 1377)
Gaudemar du Fay (died 1424)